Bois-le-Prêtre fighting (Priest's Wood,  in German) was an engagement in the First World War between September 1914 and July 1915, involving the French 73rd Division and the 128th Division (the Wolves of Bois-le-Prêtre) and the German 121st Division.

Situation
Bois le Prêtre is a Lorraine forest, to the north-west of the town of Pont-a-Mousson near the Moselle River. In 1914 German troops attacked Verdun fortifications which are a strong point inside the French defenses lines.

Facts
 The villages of Regniéville, Remenauville and Fey-en-Haye were destroyed.
 Bois-le-Pretre was one of the first mission of the volunteer American Ambulance's Field Service

See also 

 Battle of Grand Couronné
 Battle of Saint-Mihiel

External links
 http://www.greatwardifferent.com/Great_War/Poilu/Pretre_01.htm
 http://jmpicquart.pagesperso-orange.fr/ambtextGB.htm

Western Front (World War I)
Meurthe-et-Moselle
Military history of Lorraine
1914 in France
1915 in France